Trust is the debut album by American jazz saxophonist Boney James, released in 1992. The album was recorded and released on the independent label Spindletop Records. Followed by the album's success Boney James would sign up to Warner Bros. Records to record future albums.

Track listing 
 "It's A Beautiful Thing" (Jeff Carruthers/Paul Brown/James Oppenheim) - 5:05
 "Roadrunner" (James Oppenheim) - 4:14
 "Lily" (James Oppenheim/Leon Bisquera) - 5:36
 "Kyoto" (Jeff Carruthers/Paul Brown/James Oppenheim/Sam Sims/Mark Gregory) - 5:16
 "Another Place, Another Time" (Jeff Carruther/Paul Brown/James Oppenheim) - 5:12
 "Creepin'" (Stevie Wonder) - 3:39
 "Personal Touch" (James Oppenheim/Paul Brown) - 4:34
 "Trust" (Jeff Carruthers/Paul Brown/James Oppenheim/Mark Gregory) - 4:41
 "Metropolis" (Jeff Carruthers/Paul Brown/James Oppenheim/Mark Gregory) - 4:36

Personnel 
 Boney James – tenor saxophone (1, 5, 9), all other instruments (1, 2, 4, 5, 6, 8, 9), keyboards (2, 3, 7), alto saxophone (2, 3, 8), arrangements (2, 3, 7), soprano saxophone (4, 6, 7), Yamaha WX7 (9)
 Leon Bisquera – keyboards (3)
 David Torkanowsky – acoustic piano (4), acoustic piano solo (5)
 Jeff Carruthers – arrangements (1, 4, 5, 6, 8, 9), keyboards (6)
 Allen Hinds – guitars (2, 3), guitar solo (2)
 Paul Jackson Jr. – guitars (4, 6, 8, 9)
 Marcos Loya – classical guitar (7)
 Roberto Vally – bass (3, 4, 7)
 Freddie Washington – bass (8)
 Carlos Vega – drums (3, 7)
 Lenny Castro – percussion (1-8)
 Oscar Brashear – trumpet (1)
 Tollak Ollestad – harmonica solo (4)

Production 
 W. Barry Wilson – executive producer 
 Paul Brown – producer, recording, mixing  
 Teresa Caffin – recording assistant 
 Richard McIntosh – recording assistant 
 Russell Burt – assistant engineer 
 Stephen Marcussen – mastering 
 Larry Vigon – art direction, design 
 Brian Jackson – design 
 Denise Milford – photography 
 Howard Lowell – management

Studios
 Recorded at Studio Ultimo (Los Angeles, California); Alpha Studios (Burbank, California); Entourage Studios (North Hollywood, California).
 Mixed at Alpha Studios 
 Mastered at Precision Mastering (Hollywood, California).

References

1992 debut albums
Boney James albums
Warner Records albums